Edwin Eisendrath (born February 3, 1958) is former CEO of the Chicago Sun-Times and former alderman of the 43rd ward of Chicago (Lincoln Park area).

Biography
Edwin Eisendrath III was born into a Jewish family, the son of Edwin W. Eisendrath Jr. and Susan Rosenberg. His father was an 
attorney and his mother came from a powerful West Side political family. His parents divorced when he was a child, in 1970, and his mother married Lewis Manilow.
He was raised in the East Lake View neighborhood of Chicago. After graduating from Harvard University, he taught in public schools in both Appalacia and later Chicago's Wicker Park neighborhood. In 1983, he earned a master of arts in teaching at National Louis University.

At age 29, he ran for alderman in Chicago's 43rd ward to succeed the retiring Martin J. Oberman. The race, between him and attorney Robert Perkins was dubbed by observers as the Battle of the Blue Bloods as both young candidates came from wealthy, well connected families. As an alderman, he backed the ward map proposed by Richard M. Daley in a referendum. The referendum, an oddity, was a choice between two maps, but in lieu of the actual maps, voters were asked to choose a map based on a list of alderman that supported each respective map. He also backed reforming Chicago Public Schools.

He ran for Congress in Illinois's 9th congressional district in the 1990 Democratic primary election against longtime incumbent Sid Yates. Eisendrath ran an anti-incumbent campaign focused on Yates' long tenure in the United States House of Representatives. Eisendrath lost in a landslide.

In October 1993, he resigned as alderman to become the administrator for the Region V office of the Department of Housing and Urban Development (HUD) in Chicago, one of HUD's largest and busiest.  He formerly served as Vice President of Academic Affairs for Kendall College but resigned the position in 2007. He sought the Democratic nomination for Governor of Illinois in 2006 but was defeated in the primary by incumbent governor Rod Blagojevich. From 2007 to 2017, he was an international business consultant with a focus on global higher education.

In 2017, he led a group, including retired WLS-TV anchor Linda Yu and the Chicago Federation of Labor, to place a bid for the Chicago Sun-Times. It was announced July 13 that the group, ST Acquisition Holdings LLC, purchased the Sun-Times. Shortly thereafter, Eisendrath was named the Chicago Sun Times new chief executive officer.

In January 2018, he hired Mark Konkol as executive editor of then-Sun-Times-owned Chicago Reader Konkol soon published an issue with racist cover and Eisendrath fired Konkol. Later in 2018, Eisendrath resigned as CEO after meeting his original goals stating "Not only did we stop the (Tribune) merger, we successfully relocated, rebranded, restructured”.

In 2019, Eisendrath helped launch Verifiable, a company that uses advanced technologies to provide real-time license verification and continuous monitoring of healthcare providers to increase efficiency and reduce compliance costs to hospitals and other health care organization.

Most recently, Eisendrath is guest hosting at the progressive Chicago radio station WCPT820am.

Patents
Edwin is an inventor on several issued and pending US and international patents related to virtual on-line universities.

Family
Eisendrath's younger brother is television producer and writer John Eisendrath.

References

Living people
Harvard University alumni
National Louis University alumni
Illinois Democrats
Chicago City Council members
American chief executives in the media industry
Jewish American people in Illinois politics
Jews and Judaism in Chicago
1959 births
21st-century American Jews